Moysey may refer to:

 Moysey Fishbein (1946–2020), influential Ukrainian poet and translator of Jewish origin
 Moisey Kasyanik (also Moysey; 1911–1988), Soviet weightlifter
 Abel Moysey (1743–1831), English lawyer and politician
 Annie Moysey (1875–1976), Aboriginal matriarch
 Charles Moysey (1779–1859), Archdeacon of Bath from 1820 to 1839
 George Moysey (1874–1932), Australian sportsman who played Australian rules football and cricket
 Henry Luttrell Moysey (1849–1918), ninth Postmaster General of Ceylon and Director of Telegraphs

See also
 Moisei Itkis